The Einstein Girl (2009) is a novel written by Philip Sington.

Plot summary
A psychiatrist named Martin Kirsch travels across Germany, Switzerland and Serbia in search of an amnesiac woman's identity, whom she is almost dying outside Berlin in the roast-chestnut smell of Grenadierstrasse, a soggy handbill detailing one of Albert Einstein’s public lectures.

References

2009 British novels
Harvill Secker books